William Dunbar (1805 – March 18, 1861) was a U.S. Representative from Louisiana.

He was born in Virginia in 1805 and completed preparatory studies before moving to Alexandria, Virginia, where he engaged in the practice of law in the early 1830s.  Dunbar moved to Louisiana in 1852 and was appointed Associate Justice of the Supreme Court of Louisiana to fill the vacancy caused by the death of Judge Preston and served from September 1, 1852, to May 4, 1853.  He was elected as a Democrat to the Thirty-third Congress (March 4, 1853 – March 3, 1855) representing Louisiana's 1st congressional district.  Defeated by a "Know-Nothing" candidate after one term, Rep. Dunbar retired to his sugar plantation in St. Bernard Parish and resided there until his death on March 18, 1861.

References

1805 births
1861 deaths
Justices of the Louisiana Supreme Court
Democratic Party members of the United States House of Representatives from Louisiana
19th-century American politicians
19th-century American judges